Wiiliam Ernest Parker (28 March 1922 – 3 December 1974) was an Australian rules footballer who played with South Melbourne in the Victorian Football League (VFL).

War Service
Parker enlisted in the Australian Army in July 1941 as a 19 year old. He initially served in Malaya as a nursing orderly and in 1942 was declared as missing in action after the fall of Singapore. During his incarceration Parker worked on the Burma Railway and he survived to return to Australia in late 1945.

Notes

External links 

1922 births
1974 deaths
Australian rules footballers from Victoria (Australia)
Sydney Swans players
Burma Railway prisoners
Australian Army personnel of World War II
Australian Army soldiers
Missing in action of World War II
Australian prisoners of war